Giovanni Cernogoraz (born 27 December 1982) is a Croatian sports shooter. Competing in shotgun events, he won the Olympic gold medal in men's trap at the London 2012 Summer Olympics. He was elected for Croatian Sportsman of the year by Sportske novosti in 2012.

Career
Cernogoraz started with the sport at an early age, initially becoming interested in it through hunting. He is a member of the Gord sports club based in Velika Gorica and was named Velika Gorica Sportsman of the Year in 2011. After narrowly missing 2004 Olympic Games in Athens and 2008 Olympic Games in Beijing, Cernogoraz managed to qualify for 2012 Olympic Games after winning the ISSF World Cup in Beijing in 2011.

His next notable achievement was winning a gold medal in team trap along with his national team teammates, brothers Anton and Josip Glasnović, and a bronze in individual trap at the 2012 European Shotgun Championships in Larnaca.

At the 2012 Olympics he managed to qualify for the Olympic final in sixth place with score of 122. In the final, Cernogoraz scored 24 out of a possible 25, with a total score of 146, equalling the Olympic record and securing a shoot-off for the gold. In the shoot-off Cernogoraz went on to defeat Italy's Massimo Fabbrizi 6–5 to win gold. It was Croatia's first Olympic gold and only the second shooting sports medal ever won in its entire Olympic history. It was also the first Olympic gold won by an athlete from Istria after Mate Parlov's boxing gold in the 1972 Summer Olympics.

Personal life
Cernogoraz lives in the town of Novigrad in Croatia, where he works as a waiter at his father's restaurant.

Cernogoraz is an Istrian Italian and holds an Italian passport.  He is married and has two children. Cernogoraz is a Roman Catholic.

Olympic results

References

External links
Profile at the International Shooting Sport Federation website
"Priča o prvaku: Novi heroj nacije vlasnik prvog hrvatskog streljačkog zlata u povijesti olimpizma" 

1982 births
Living people
Croatian male sport shooters
Olympic shooters of Croatia
Shooters at the 2012 Summer Olympics
Shooters at the 2016 Summer Olympics
Olympic gold medalists for Croatia
Trap and double trap shooters
Olympic medalists in shooting
Sportspeople from Koper
Istrian Italian people
Medalists at the 2012 Summer Olympics
Mediterranean Games bronze medalists for Croatia
Competitors at the 2013 Mediterranean Games
Mediterranean Games medalists in shooting
European Games competitors for Croatia
Shooters at the 2019 European Games
Croatian Roman Catholics
21st-century Croatian people